Caelis is a Michelin-starred restaurant in Barcelona, Spain. In 2002,  Toulouse chef Romain Fornell took over the Diana restaurant at the El Palace Hotel and renamed it Caelis in 2004. It received its Michelin star the next year. The restaurant was closed from 2009 to 2011, when the hotel underwent a major renovation. Caelis moved to the Hotel Ohla in 2017.

References

External links

Michelin Guide starred restaurants in Spain
Restaurants in Barcelona